Yevgeny Alekseyevich Seredin (10 February 1958 – 5 April 2006) was a Russian swimmer who competed in the 1976 and 1980 Summer Olympics. In 1980, he won a silver medal in the 4×100 m medley relay and placed fifth in the individual 100 m butterfly event. He held eight Soviet titles: in the 100 m butterfly (1976, 1978–79), medley relay (1977–79), and 4×100 m and 4×200 m freestyle relays (1979). After retiring in 1983, Seredin coached swimmers in Saint Petersburg. He died of a heart attack.

References

1958 births
2006 deaths
Russian male swimmers
Male butterfly swimmers
Olympic swimmers of the Soviet Union
Swimmers at the 1976 Summer Olympics
Swimmers at the 1980 Summer Olympics
Olympic silver medalists for the Soviet Union
Medalists at the 1980 Summer Olympics
Olympic silver medalists in swimming
Soviet male swimmers